Yonghe Yongping Elementary School is an under construction metro station on the Wanda–Zhonghe–Shulin line located in the western part of Yonghe, New Taipei, Taiwan. The station is scheduled to open at the end of 2025.

Station overview 
The station will be a three-level, underground station with an island platform. The station will be designed based on the concept that is derived from the integration and expansion of green environments in schools, and an underground botanical garden will be introduced in this station as well.

Originally, the name of this station was planned to be "Yonghe Station." However, after considering that this station still has quite a distance from Central Yonghe, it was decided that the name of the station be changed to Yonghe Yongping Elementary School. The station name originates from Yonghe, the name of the district, and the nearby Yongping Elementary School.

Station layout

Around the station 
Yongping Elementary School
Renai Park
Museum of World Religions

References 

Wanda–Zhonghe–Shulin line stations
Railway stations scheduled to open in 2025